Sperg, a character from the TV show The Grim Adventures of Billy & Mandy.
Sperg, a derogatory slang term for someone with Asperger syndrome, autism spectrum disorder or someone showing traits that are commonly associated with it.